5 x Monk 5 x Lacy is a live solo album by the soprano saxophonist Steve Lacy, recorded in Sweden in 1994 and released on the Silkheart label.

Reception

In Allmusic, Scott Yanow awarded the album 4½ stars, writing that Lacey's "interpretations are so self-sufficient that one does not miss the other instruments, although it is quite easy to 'hear' the bass and drums behind the soprano... Highly recommended". The Penguin Guide to Jazz included the album in its "Core Collection" of recommended jazz recordings. According to JazzTimes, "the entirety of Lacy's art is to be found in compacted form in solo concerts like 5 X Monk 5 X Lacy".

Track listing
All compositions are by Steve Lacy except as indicated
 "Shuffle Boil" (Thelonious Monk) - 3:48   
 "Eronel" (Monk) - 3:49   
 "Evidence" (Monk) - 3:37   
 "Pannonica" (Monk) - 5:24   
 "Who Knows?" (Monk) - 3:12   
 "The Crust" - 4:31   
 "Blues for Aida" - 5:51   
 "Revenue" - 5:27   
 "Lunch" - 4:13   
 "Deadline"- 5:15

Personnel
Steve Lacy - soprano saxophone

References

 
1997 live albums
Steve Lacy (saxophonist) live albums
Silkheart Records live albums